Stuyvesant Light was also known as Kinderhook Light.

In 1835, the lightkeeper was John Carroll, born in New York and paid $300 for the year.

References

Lighthouses completed in 1829
Lighthouses completed in 1868
Lighthouses in New York (state)
Transportation buildings and structures in Columbia County, New York